The 3rd Independent Battery Wisconsin Light Artillery , nicknamed the "Badger Battery," was an artillery battery that served in the Union Army during the American Civil War.

Service
The 3rd Independent Battery was mustered into service at Racine, Wisconsin, on October 10, 1861.

The battery was mustered out on July 20, 1865.

Total strength and casualties
The 3rd Independent Battery initially recruited 170 officers and men.  An additional 67 men were recruited as replacements, for a total of 237
men.

The battery suffered 6 enlisted men killed in action or died of wounds and 21 enlisted men who died of disease, for a total of 27 fatalities.

Commanders
 Captain Lu H. Drury

See also

 List of Wisconsin Civil War units
 Wisconsin in the American Civil War

Notes

References
The Civil War Archive

Military units and formations established in 1861
Military units and formations disestablished in 1865
Units and formations of the Union Army from Wisconsin
1861 establishments in Wisconsin
Artillery units and formations of the American Civil War